Noelle W. Arnold, Ph.D. (sometimes listed as Noelle Witherspoon Arnold), is a Senior Associate Dean, Professor and the director of the EdD in Educational Administration program in the College of Education and Human Ecology at Ohio State University. She is the first female African American president of the University Council for Educational Administration, an academic organization for those researching educational administration in North America. A former administrator at the district and state level, she has served as a consultant for National Public Radio and throughout the United States advising districts in school improvement, culture and race mediation, STEM leadership for education and teaching and leading in urban and rural contexts.

Dr. Arnold has more than 40 publications and her articles have appeared in leading educational journals, including the Teachers College Record, International Journal of Leadership in Education, Journal of Negro Education, International Journal of Educational Reform and the Journal of Educational Administration. She has nine books published or in-press including most recently the Handbook of Urban Educational Leadership. Dr. Arnold serves as the series editor of New Directions in Educational Leadership.

Dr. Arnold also serves as Associate Dean of Diversity, Inclusion and Community Engagement for the College of Education and Human Ecology at The Ohio State University. In this role, she leads the Office of Diversity, Inclusion, and Community Engagement (DICE) in developing, promoting and supporting dynamic programming to encourage critical thinking about diversity, equity and inclusion. The office engages in high-quality research, outreach and advocacy efforts focusing on social, civil and educational rights.

Publications

Bruce Makoto Arnold, Roland W. Mitchell, and Noelle W. Arnold, "Massified Illusions of Difference:Photography and the Mystique of the American Historically Black Colleges and Universities (HBCUs)", in Journal of American Studies of Turkey, 41 (2015): 69–94.

Previous Experience
Affiliate Faculty Member, Black Studies, University of Missouri, (2012-2015)
Program Coordinator of PK-12 Educational Leadership and Policy Studies, University of Missouri, Columbia (2012-2013)
Assistant Professor, Educational Leadership and Policy Analysis, University of Missouri-Columbia (2010-2013)
Affiliate Faculty Member, Women and Gender Studies, Louisiana State University (2010)
Co-Coordinator for the Educational Leadership Doctoral Program, Louisiana State University (2008-2009)
Assistant Professor, Louisiana State University, Educational Theory, Policy and Practice (2007-2010)

References

Year of birth missing (living people)
Living people
University of Missouri faculty
Ohio State University faculty
African-American educators
Educational administration
21st-century African-American people